The Czech Republic National Basketball League (NBL) is the top-tier level professional basketball league in the Czech Republic. It is run by the Asociace Ligových Klubů. The league operates under a promotion and relegation system. The bottom two NBL teams from each season's standings are relegated to the 2nd-tier level 1. Liga, while the top two 1. Liga teams from each season's standings are promoted to the NBL.

ČEZ Nymburk has won every league title since the 2003–04 season.

Logos

Teams
The following are the teams in the 2021–22 season:
 Armex Děčín
 ČEZ Nymburk
 Dekstone Tuři Svitavy
 Fiobanka Jindřichův Hradec
 Geosan Kolín
 JIP Pardubice
 mmcité+ Brno
 NH Ostrava
 Opava 
 Sluneta Ústí nad Labem
 USK Praha
 Redstone Olomoucko
 Královští Sokoli Hradec Králové

Performance by club

Playoff Finals
The champion is determined in a playoff, with the bottom two teams getting sent to the 1. liga.

See also
 Česká Basketbalová Federace - The governing body of basketball in the Czech Republic.
 Czechoslovak Basketball League
 Czech Republic Basketball Cup

References

External links
Official Website 
Eurobasket.com League Profile

 
Basketball leagues in the Czech Republic
Basketball leagues in Europe
Professional sports leagues in the Czech Republic